The  Amateur Athletic Association is an amateur basketball league that was created in 1897. It hosts the annual AAU National Tournament. All players participating have to be amateurs.

During the 1960s players who left college before the formation of the American Basketball League and
American Basketball Association had three options: the National Basketball Association, the Eastern League or AAU basketball. And AAU basketball was attractive to many players who wished to remain eligible for the Olympics. Several AAU teams were sponsored by corporations which provided jobs to the players on their teams.

Famous NBA names played or coached in the AAU Tournaments such as David Robinson, Larry Brown, Gregg Popovich, Bob Kurland, Mike Krzyzewski (as a coach), Jay Triano, Phil Jordon, Roger Brown, George Yardley, Jim Pollard, Clyde Lovellette and Bob Boozer.

History
The tournament started in 1897 and met incredible success until the late 50s. There a few occasion that college players rejected NBA careers opting to play in the AAU. Bill Reigel Reigel who went on to choose the Amateur Athletic Union over an offer from the NBA's Minneapolis Lakers was one of them, managing to earn AAU All-American honors four times. Another great college player who chose AAU over NBA was legendary Bob Kurland.
The quality of AAU basketball waned in the 1960s as the expansion of the NBA and the arrival of the ABL followed by the ABA created professional opportunities for the players the AAU teams were seeking. In 1972, the International Basketball Federation withdrew its recognition of the AAU as the institution responsible for organizing U.S. basketball teams. Signaling an end for old AAU basketball, although 1968 was the last year for the annual tournament in Denver.

List of AAU champions and All-Americans

James E. Sullivan Award
 Bill Bradley	(1965)
 Bill Walton	(1973)
 Charlie Ward	(1993)
 Chamique Holdsclaw	(1998)

References

External links
Hoopedia's list of AAU Tournament champions

Defunct basketball leagues in the United States
Amateur Athletic Union